Connel Burn is a river in East Ayrshire, Scotland which rises at Enoch Hill in the Southern Uplands and flows northwards through Laglaf and Connel Park before meeting the River Nith in New Cumnock.

References

Rivers of East Ayrshire